Yamuna is an Indian actress who has appeared primarily in Telugu films in addition to a few Malayalam, Kannada and Tamil films. She appeared in films like Mamagaru, Mouna Poratam, and Yerra Mandaram. She also acted in TV shows.

Personal life 
Yamuna was born as Prema in Bangalore, Karnataka into a Telugu-speaking family. Their native is Chittoor, Andhra Pradesh but her family later moved to Bangalore. Director Balachander changed her name to Yamuna after film debut.

Career 
Yamuna made her debut in film in a lead role through Kannada film Modada Mareyalli (1989) alongside Shiva Rajkumar. She acted in over 50 Kannada and Telugu movies as the female lead. She shot into fame in 1989 with award-winning Telugu film Mouna Poratam which is based on the real-life story of Sabita Badhei, which gained massive media coverage. Yamuna played the role of Durga who is betrayed by a government officer and fights for her conjugal rights, seeking marital recognition to give proper identity to her illegitimate child.

Later she played one of the leads opposite Vinod Kumar in another successful film Mamagaru. In the 1990 film Puttinti Pattu Cheera, she played the role of an unlucky daughter who is harassed by her in-laws. She was also played the lead actress in 1990 film Erramandaram. She also acted in Kannada films with Siva Rajkumar and Ravichandran.

After her marriage, she took a break from acting. After the break she started acting in TV serials. She appeared in the TV series Anveshitha which was broadcast on ETV.

Allegations 
Yamuna was arrested for her alleged involvement in a brothel racket in the ITC Royal Gardenia, a five star hotel, in January 2011 in Bangalore. In a YouTube interview, Frankly with TNR, she said she was exonerated by the court of chargers as they were false allegations.

Filmography

Telugu 

 Mouna Poratam (1989) as Durga
 Puttinti Pattu Cheera (1990)
 Inspector Rudra (1990)
 Ghatana (1990)
 Udyamam (1990) (Etv)
 Yerra Mandaram (1991) as Arundhati
 Gowramma (1991)
 Mamagaru (1991) as Lakshmi
 Nagamma (1991)
 College Bullodu (1992) as Shobha
 Surigaadu (1992)
 Bangaru mama (1992)
 Adrushtam (1992) 
 Prema Vijetha (1992)
 Aadarsham (1993) as Vani
 Rajadhani (1993)
 Brahmachari Mogudu (1994) as Jayalakshmi
 Moodada Mareyali (1994)
 Mantrala Marrichettu (1994)
 Bangaru Kutumbam (1994) as Krishnaveni
 Govinda Govinda (1994) as Goddess Mahalakshmi
 Dear Brother (1995)
 Premaku Padi Sutralu (1995)
 Bachi (2000) as Parvathi
 Eduruleni Manishi (2001) as Bhavani
 Sri Manjunatha (2001) as River Ganga
 O Chinnadana (2002)
 Manasu Pilichindi (2009)
 Bhageerathudu (2010)
 Keratam (2011)
 Taxiwaala (2018) as Sisira's mother

Malayalam 

 Thoranam (1987) 
 Mazhanoolkkanavu (2003)
 Vellinakshatram (2004)

Kannada 

 Modada Mareyalli (1989)
 Mavanige Thakka Aliya (1992)
 Hendathire Husharu (1992)
 Keralida Sarpa (1994)
 Chinna (1994)
 Prema Geethe (1997)
 Hello Yama (1998)
 Sri Manjunatha (2001) as River Ganga
 Haage Summane (2008)
 Naariya Seere Kadda (2010)
 Kanteerava (2011)
 Shambho Shankara (2010)
 Dil Rangeela (2014)
 Rajahamsa (2017)

Tamil 

 Manathil Uruthi Vendum (1987) - Debut in Tamil
 Mouna Porattam (1989)
 Dilli Babu (1989)
 Aadi Viratham (1991)
 Porantha Veetu Pattu Pudavai (1991)
 Sivasankari (1992)
 I Love India (1992)
 Yuga (2006)
 Yuvan (2011)

Television 
 Thiruvilaiyadal (Sun TV)
 Amman (Sun TV)
 Vidhi (ETV) as Saroja / Rosy
 Anveshitha (ETV) as Snigdha Devi
 Raktha Sambandham (Gemini TV)
 Allare Allari (ETV Plus)
 Seethama Vakitilo Sirimalle Chettu (Vidhi-2) as Rosy
 Lakshmi (Udaya TV)
 Lakshmi Jhansiya Magalu (Udaya TV)
 Devi (Zee Kannada)
 Damini (Gemini TV)
 Amrutam
 Mouna Poratam (ETV)

References

External links 
 

Living people
Indian film actresses
Actresses in Telugu cinema
Actresses in Kannada cinema
Year of birth missing (living people)
Actresses in Telugu television
Indian television actresses
20th-century Indian actresses
21st-century Indian actresses
Actresses in Malayalam cinema
Actresses in Tamil cinema
Actresses in Tamil television
Telugu actresses